Madly Bangalee is a Bengali 2009 rock musical film directed by Anjan Dutt. During his previous film "Bong Connection" shot in Houston, Director Anjan Dutt received lot of help and support from Houston filmmaker San Banarje who arranged for the film's American cast and crew and saved the film. During this period, Anjan Dutt became a self-proclaimed fan of San Banarje and named the protagonist of this film after San.

Plot 

Madly Bangalee is a Bengali rock band that inspires the film's title. They rehearse in a dowdy garage of Kolkata, owned by Bobby (Lew Hilt), who owns Bobby's Garage. Four young boys with stardust in their eyes practise their numbers not knowing what they are really aiming at. But the garage is under threat from a South Kolkata don Baburam (Chandan Sen). One morning, an elderly man, San (Anjan Dutt), arrives from "America and Paris." Baaji, (Sumit) the drummer who is a Muslim had to drop out of school. He escapes from the trap of turning a terrorist like his older brother Sultan. He later becomes a police officer who bashes up everyone who tries to bribe him. Neon (Tanaji Dasgupta) plays the bass guitar but, sucked into the world of drugs, he disappears from the face of the earth with his guitar. Pablo, lead singer, lead guitarist and lyricist, leaves for the US and the group breaks up. Bobby dies.

Cast

 Soumyak Kanti DeBiswas as Pablo
 Anubrata Basu as Benji
Tanaji Dasgupta as Neon
 Sumeet Thakur as Baaji
 Roshni Bose as Joy
 Anasuya Sengupta as Tanya
 Anjan Dutt as San aka Sandip Banerjee
 Saswata Chatterjee
 Siddhartha Chatterjee
 Biswajit Chokraborty
 Aparajita Auddy
 Supriya Choudhury

Critical reception
CT journalist Anirban De praised the movie saying "I just don’t know how to express the varied emotions that blended all too well in bringing to life the music mania that has been haunting the Bengali rock crazy cult through the ages. Anjan Dutt’s ‘Madly Bangalee’ is no doubt more than a mere tribute to the passion of rock and Neel Dutt complements the passion by compiling an ensemble of entrancing numbers enriched by the voices of Anjan Dutt himself, Nachiketa Chakraborty, Rupam Islam and Arko – the latter's ‘Mere Maula’ being the most captivating of the lot. Indraneel Mukherjee’s cinematography adds up to the romance."

Soundtrack

References

2009 films
Bengali-language Indian films
Films set in Kolkata
Films directed by Anjan Dutt
2000s Bengali-language films